Moisés Arizmendi (born April 22, 1976)  is a Mexican actor. He is most recognised for his portrayal of Amador Zuñiga, the recurring character on the Televisa telenovela The Color of Passion.

Early life 
Arizmendi began his theatrical training at the Foro de la Ribera in Mexico City, school where figures like Plutarco Haza, Ilse Salas, and Miguel Rodarte were also formed. Later he continued his studies with Héctor Mendoza and was part of the national theater company. His film debut was in 2006 with the film Efectos secundarios and then ventured into series such as Locas de amor, Capadocia, Soy tu fan, and La Reina del sur.

Filmography

References

External links 
 

Living people
Mexican male telenovela actors
Mexican male film actors
20th-century Mexican male actors
21st-century Mexican male actors
Mexican male television actors
1976 births